The 28th Biathlon World Championships were held in 1993 in Borovets, Bulgaria.

Men's results

20 km individual

10 km sprint

Team event

4 × 7.5 km relay

Women's results

15 km individual

7.5 km sprint

Team event

4 × 7.5 km relay

Medal table

References

International sports competitions hosted by Bulgaria
Biathlon World Championships
February 1993 sports events in Europe
Biathlon competitions in Bulgaria
1993
1993 in Bulgarian sport
Borovets